The Warren Street station was an express station on the demolished IRT Ninth Avenue Line in Manhattan, New York City. It had three tracks, one island platform and two side platforms. It was served by trains from the IRT Ninth Avenue Line. It opened on February 14, 1870 and closed on June 11, 1940. The next southbound local stop was Barclay Street. The next southbound express stop was Cortlandt Street. The next northbound local stop was Franklin Street. The next northbound express stop was Desbrosses Street.

References

IRT Ninth Avenue Line stations
Railway stations in the United States opened in 1870
Railway stations closed in 1940
Former elevated and subway stations in Manhattan
1870 establishments in New York (state)
1940 disestablishments in New York (state)